Maurice Joseph Reeves (28 February 1930 – 30 September 2013) was an Australian rules footballer who played with Melbourne in the Victorian Football League (VFL).

Notes

External links 		

		
		
		
	
1930 births	
2013 deaths
Australian rules footballers from Victoria (Australia)		
Melbourne Football Club players
Warragul Football Club players